Bernd Gallowitsch (23 February 1918 – 23 December 1983) was a German Luftwaffe ace and recipient of the Knight's Cross of the Iron Cross during World War II.  The Knight's Cross of the Iron Cross was awarded to recognise extreme battlefield bravery or successful military leadership.  Bernd Gallowitsch was credited with 64 aerial victories, and the destruction of 23 tanks in 480 combat missions.

In 1945, he was assigned to JG 1 a He-162 jet fighter unit.

Summary of career

Aerial victory claims
According to US historian David T. Zabecki, Gallowitsch was credited with 64 aerial victories. Mathews and Foreman, authors of Luftwaffe Aces – Biographies and Victory Claims, researched the German Federal Archives and found records for 48 aerial victory claims plus two further unconfirmed clams. With the exception of four aerial victories claimed over the Western Allies, all other aerial victories were claimed on the Eastern Front.

Awards
 Flugzeugführerabzeichen
 Front Flying Clasp of the Luftwaffe in Gold
 Iron Cross (1939) 2nd and 1st Class
 Honour Goblet of the Luftwaffe on 15 September 1941 as Leutnant in a Jagdgeschwader
 Knight's Cross of the Iron Cross on 24 January 1942 as Leutnant and pilot in the 12./Jagdgeschwader 51 "Mölders"

References

Citations

Bibliography

External links
Lexikon der Wehrmacht

1918 births
1983 deaths
Military personnel from Vienna
German World War II flying aces
Recipients of the Knight's Cross of the Iron Cross
Austrian military personnel of World War II